Charles "Charlie" Henry Horley (birth registered July→September 1860 — 10 May 1924) was an English rugby union footballer who played in the 1880s. He played at representative level for England, and at club level for Swinton, as a forward, e.g. front row, lock, or back row. Prior to Tuesday 2 June 1896, Swinton was a rugby union club.

Background
Charlie Horley's birth was registered in Pendlebury, Lancashire, and he died aged 63 in Birkdale, Lancashire.

Playing career

International honours
Charlie Horley won a cap for England while at Swinton in 1885 against Ireland.

Change of Code
When Swinton converted from the rugby union code to the rugby league code on Tuesday 2 June 1896, Charlie Horley would have been approximately 36 years of age. Consequently, he may have been both a rugby union and rugby league footballer for Swinton.

Genealogical information
Charlie Horley's marriage was registered during July→September 1886 in Chorlton district.

References

External links
Search for "Horley" at rugbyleagueproject.org
Search for "Henry Horley" at britishnewspaperarchive.co.uk
Search for "Charles Henry Horley" at britishnewspaperarchive.co.uk
Search for "Charles Horley" at britishnewspaperarchive.co.uk
Search for "Charlie Horley" at britishnewspaperarchive.co.uk

1860 births
1924 deaths
England international rugby union players
English rugby union players
People from Pendlebury
Rugby union forwards
Rugby union players from Salford
Swinton Lions players